Sultan Abdul Halim Airport  is an airport in Kepala Batas, Kedah, Malaysia. It serves the city of Alor Setar and state of Perlis due to the state's small geographical size (but international as well as cross-sea flights to the Northern Peninsular, especially those from East Malaysia utilises the Penang International Airport as the main gateway).

Built in 1929, the airport is the 2nd oldest airport in Peninsular Malaysia, after Taiping Airport. The new terminal is already operational by 5 May 2006 to cater for future traffic growth. In 2009, the airport handled 421,314 passengers with 24,031 aircraft movements.

The Royal Malaysian Air Force training division is also co-located and uses the same runway as the airport.

Airlines and destinations

Traffic and statistics

Transportation

This airport nearby Anak Bukit railway station within 5 to 8 minutes by taxi. This station are connected to main city and town in Kedah and Perlis like Alor Setar, Gurun, Sungai Petani, Kangar, Arau and Padang Besar.

Notes

References

External links
 Sultan Abdul Halim Airport, Alor Setar at Malaysia Airports Holdings Berhad
 
 

Airports in Kedah
Kubang Pasu District
Northern Corridor Economic Region